Joseph Russell Jones (born October 29, 1962) is an American football coach and former player. His previous role was for two seasons as the former special teams coordinator at Mississippi State, hired by Head Coach, Joe Moorehead.  Jones served as the Head Football Coach at the University of South Alabama from 2008 to 2017.

Playing career
Jones is a graduate of Mobile's Murphy High School. He played college football for coach Bear Bryant at the University of Alabama. Jones lettered with the Tide from 1979 to 1983, graduating with a degree in business administration. As a wide receiver, he tallied 71 receptions, 1,386 yards and 15 touchdowns. He ranked third among Alabama's career touchdown receivers and seventh in career receiving yards. He was named All-SEC as a senior and chosen to participate in the Senior Bowl. He was a member of the University of Alabama's All-Decade Team for the 1980s and played professionally with the Birmingham Stallions of the United States Football League and the National Football League's Atlanta Falcons.

Coaching career
In 1989, Jones took his first coaching job as an assistant coach on the Briarwood Christian School staff in Birmingham, Alabama. After two years at Briarwood, he took the job as head coach at Dora where he led his team to a 24–11 record over three seasons. In 1996, Jones was hired as the head coach at Mountain Brook High School. At Mountain Brook, he led his team to the 1996 Class 6A state championship game, four region titles, two semifinal appearances and three quarterfinal appearances. Jones went 101–27 over ten seasons in charge of the Spartans.

After compiling a .767 winning percentage as an Alabama high school coach, Jones was hired as the new head coach at Birmingham–Southern College, where he led the team to a 1–7 record in its first season in NCAA Division III football in 2007. Jones was the first coach of the Panthers since 1939, when the football program was disbanded.

After only one season at BSC, Jones accepted the same position at the University of South Alabama in February 2008. He was the first coach for the Jaguars and was in charge of creating the program. The team began play in 2009, and joined the NCAA Football Bowl Subdivision (Division I-A) in 2012 as members of the Sunbelt Conference.

Jones led South Alabama to a 23–4 record in his first three seasons at South Alabama as Division-I FCS independent.  After initially struggling after moving to the Sun Belt Conference with a 2–11 record in 2012, the team has since improved and posted a winning record against in-conference competition.  The 2014 season saw South Alabama selected to the 2014 Camellia Bowl, their first bowl game which they lost to Bowling Green 33–28.

On November 20, 2017, Jones announced he would resign from his position as head coach following the 2017 season.

On February 22, 2018 news broke that Jones had been hired as Special Teams Coordinator at Mississippi State University.

Honors
In 2011, Jones was chosen to be inducted into the Mobile Sports Hall of Fame.

Head coaching record

College

References

External links
 South Alabama Jaguars bio

1962 births
Living people
Sportspeople from Mobile, Alabama
Players of American football from Alabama
American football wide receivers
Alabama Crimson Tide football players
Birmingham Stallions players
Atlanta Falcons players
Coaches of American football from Alabama
High school football coaches in Alabama
Birmingham–Southern Panthers football coaches
South Alabama Jaguars football coaches
Mississippi State Bulldogs football coaches